Endings, Beginnings is a 2019 romantic drama film, directed by Drake Doremus, from a screenplay he wrote alongside Jardine Libaire. The film is semi-improvised and loosely based on the screenplay. It stars Shailene Woodley, Jamie Dornan, and Sebastian Stan.

It had its world premiere at the Toronto International Film Festival on September 8, 2019. It was released on April 17, 2020, by Samuel Goldwyn Films.

Premise

Cast
 Shailene Woodley as Daphne, Billie's sister, Adrian's ex-girlfriend, Sue's daughter and a thirty-something woman navigating love and heartbreak over the course of one year
 Jamie Dornan as Jack, an Irish writer
 Sebastian Stan as Frank
 Matthew Gray Gubler as Adrian, Daphne's ex-boyfriend
 Lindsay Sloane as Billie, the foil sister of Daphne and Sue's daughter, who is the financial shoulder for Daphne to lean on, and is married with a baby on the way
 Ben Esler as Jed
 Shamier Anderson as Jonathan
 Noureen DeWulf as Noureen
 Wendie Malick as Sue, Daphne and Billie's mother
 Kyra Sedgwick as Ingrid
 Sherry Cola as Chris
 Jonathan Freeman as Graham
 Kai Lennox as Fred

Production
It was announced in October 2018 that filming had begun on Drake Doremus’s next film project, which he co-wrote with author Jardine Libaire in Los Angeles. Shailene Woodley, Jamie Dornan, Sebastian Stan, Matthew Gray Gubler, Lindsay Sloane and Shamier Anderson were set to star. In November 2018, Sherry Cola joined the cast of the film.

Release
The film had its world premiere at the Toronto International Film Festival on September 8, 2019. Shortly after, Samuel Goldwyn Films acquired distribution rights to the film. It was originally scheduled to be released in theaters on May 1, 2020. On March 26, 2020, the COVID-19 pandemic led to the film being brought forward and released digitally on April 17, 2020.

Reception
The site's critical consensus reads, "Endings, Beginnings smothers its talented ensemble cast's committed work in a carelessly constructed, aimlessly dawdling story." On Metacritic, the film holds a rating of 42 out of 100, based on 18 critics, indicating "mixed or average reviews".

Peter DeBruge of Variety gave the film a negative review, writing: "Doremus tells his story in snippets, jump-cutting between grubby handheld footage of Daphne's life shot from with her face all or partially obscured. The film traps us outside her head, never really allowing us inside it." David Rooney of The Hollywood Reporter also gave the film a negative review writing: "The movie aims to make Daphne's journey raw and real, but mostly it's just insipid." Jeanette Catsoulis of The New York Times gave the film a positive review writing: "The writing might be a tangle of limp clichés, but the actors - especially Woodley and the terrific Wendie Malick as Daphne's mother - sweat to sell every line." Pete Hammond  of Deadline Hollywood also gave the film a positive review writing: "Shailene Woodley, Jamie Dornan, and Sebastian Stan enliven and enrich this film of three 30-somethings caught up in a love triangle."

References

External links
 
 
 

2019 films
2019 independent films
2019 romantic drama films
American romantic drama films
CJ Entertainment films
South Korean romantic drama films
Films shot in Los Angeles
Films directed by Drake Doremus
English-language South Korean films
Films not released in theaters due to the COVID-19 pandemic
Samuel Goldwyn Films films
2010s English-language films
2010s American films
2010s South Korean films